Cinnamon is a free and open-source desktop environment for Linux and Unix-like operating systems, deriving from GNOME 3 but following traditional desktop metaphor conventions.

The development of Cinnamon began by the Linux Mint team as a reaction to the April 2011 release of GNOME 3 in which the conventional desktop metaphor of GNOME 2 was abandoned in favor of GNOME Shell. Following several attempts to extend GNOME 3 such that it would suit the Linux Mint design goals, the Mint developers forked several GNOME 3 components to build an independent desktop environment. Separation from GNOME was completed in Cinnamon 2.0, which was released in October 2013. Applets and desklets are no longer compatible with GNOME 3.

As the distinguishing factor of Linux Mint, Cinnamon has generally received favorable coverage by the press, in particular for its ease of use and gentle learning curve. With respect to its conservative design model, Cinnamon is similar to the Xfce, MATE, GNOME 2 (and GNOME Flashback) desktop environments.

History
Like several other desktop environments based on GNOME, including Canonical's Unity, Cinnamon was a product of dissatisfaction with GNOME team's abandonment of a traditional desktop experience in April 2011. Until then, GNOME (i.e. GNOME 2) had included the traditional desktop metaphor, but in GNOME 3 this was replaced with GNOME Shell, which lacked a taskbar-like panel and other basic features of a conventional desktop. The elimination of these elementary features was unacceptable to the developers of distributions such as Mint and Ubuntu, which are addressed to users who want interfaces that they would immediately be comfortable with.

To overcome these differences, the Linux Mint team initially set out to develop extensions for the GNOME Shell to replace the abandoned features. The results of this effort were the "Mint GNOME Shell Extensions" (MGSE). Meanwhile, the MATE desktop environment had also been forked from GNOME 2. Linux Mint 12, released in November 2011, subsequently included both, thereby giving users a choice of either GNOME 3-with-MGSE or a traditional GNOME 2 desktop.

However, even with MGSE, GNOME 3 was still largely missing the comforts of GNOME 2 and was not well received by the user community. At the time, some of the missing features could not be replaced by extensions, and it seemed that extensions would not be viable in the long run. Moreover, the GNOME developers were not amenable to the needs of the Mint developers. To give the Mint developers finer control over the development process, GNOME Shell was forked as "Project Cinnamon" in January 2012.

Gradually, various core applications were adapted by the Mint developers. Beginning with version 1.2, released in January 2012, Cinnamon's window manager is Muffin, which was originally a fork of GNOME 3's Mutter. Similarly, since September 2012 (version 1.6 onwards), Cinnamon includes the Nemo file manager which was forked from Nautilus. Cinnamon-Control-Center, included since May 2013 (version 1.8 onwards), combines the functionality of GNOME-Control-Center with that of Cinnamon-Settings, and made it possible to manage and update applets, extensions, desklets and themes through the control-center. Gnome-Screensaver was also forked and is now called Cinnamon-Screensaver.

Since October 2013 (version 2.0 onwards), Cinnamon is no longer a frontend on top of the GNOME desktop like Unity or GNOME Shell, but a discrete desktop environment in its own right. Although Cinnamon is still built on GNOME technologies and uses GTK, it no longer requires GNOME itself to be installed.

Further improvements in later versions include a desktop grid, wildcard support in file searches, multi-process settings daemon, desktop actions in the panel launcher, separate processes for desktop handling and file manager in Nemo; an additional desktop panel layout option that offers a more modern looking theme and grouped windows; improved naming for duplicate applications in the menu (i.e. Flatpak vs. deb packages), pinned files in Nemo, and a focus on performance improvements.

Software components

X-Apps 

Cinnamon introduces X-Apps which are based on GNOME Core Applications but are changed to work across Cinnamon, MATE and XFCE; they have the traditional user interface (UI).

 Xed is a text editor based on Gedit/pluma
 Xviewer is an image viewer based on Eye of GNOME
 Xreader is a document viewer based on Evince/Atril
 Xplayer is a media player based on GNOME Videos (Totem)
 Pix is an image organizer based on gThumb

Features
Features provided by Cinnamon include
 Desktop effects, including animations, transition effects and transparency using composition;
 Panels equipped with a main menu, launchers, a window list and the system tray can be adjusted on left, right, upper or lower edge of the screen
 Various extensions;
 Applets that appear on the panel
 Overview with functions similar to that in GNOME Shell; and
 Settings editor for easy customization. It can customize:
 The panel
 The calendar
 Themes
 Desktop effects
 Applets
 Extensions
 Volume and brightness adjustment using scroll wheel while pointing at the respective taskbar icon.
 Hot corners on the screen

 there was no official documentation for Cinnamon itself, There is documentation for the Cinnamon edition of Linux Mint, with a chapter on the Cinnamon desktop.

Overview mode
New overview modes have been added to Cinnamon 1.4. These two modes are "Expo" and "Scale", which can be configured in Cinnamon Settings.

Extensibility 
Cinnamon can be modified by themes, applets and extensions. Themes can customize the look of aspects of Cinnamon, including but not limited to the menu, panel, calendar and run dialog. Applets are icons or texts that appear on the panel. Five applets are shipped by default, and developers are free to create their own. A tutorial for creating simple applets is available. Extensions can modify the functionalities of Cinnamon, such as providing a dock or altering the look of the  window switcher.

Developers can upload their themes, applets and extension to Cinnamon's web page and let users download and rate.

Adoption

Reception
In their review of Linux Mint 17, Ars Technica described Cinnamon 2.2 as "being perhaps the most user-friendly and all-around useful desktop available on any platform."

In their review of Linux Mint 18, ZDNet said: "You can turn the Linux Mint Cinnamon desktop into the desktop of your dreams."

Gallery

See also 
 GNOME Shell
 MATE (software) - fork of GNOME 2

References

External links

 
 Spices: Cinnamon - Official addons repository
Cinnamon Desktop in OpenSourceFeed Gallery

Desktop environments based on GTK
Free desktop environments
GNOME
Graphical shells that use GTK
Software forks
X Window System